The 1939 season of the Mitropa Cup football club tournament was won by Újpest who defeated fellow Hungarian side Ferencváros 6–3 on aggregate in the final. It was the third consecutive final appearance for Ferencváros and it was Újpest's second and final victory in the competition.

This was the 13th edition of the tournament. Last season's winners Slavia Prague were eliminated in the quarter finals by Yugoslavian side Beogradski SK.

Quarterfinals

|}

Semifinals

|}

Finals

|}

Top goalscorers

External links

References

1939–40
1939–40 in European football
1939–40 in Czechoslovak football
1939–40 in Hungarian football
1939–40 in Italian football
1939–40 in Romanian football
1939–40 in Yugoslav football